Grunewald is a German forest located in the western side of Berlin on the east side of the Havel, mainly in the Grunewald locality. At  it is the largest green area in the city of Berlin.

Geography
The forest occupies, on the western side, 3/4 of the Grunewald locality, a small portion of the southern part of Westend (both in the Charlottenburg-Wilmersdorf borough); a great part of Nikolassee, the northern side of Zehlendorf and the northwestern part of Dahlem (all 3 in the Steglitz-Zehlendorf borough). It is close to the border of the neighborhood of Wannsee and its lake, and is near the Düppel forest. It is divided by the Havel river from the localities of Kladow, Gatow and Wilhelmstadt (all in the Spandau borough). It also borders the locality of Schmargendorf.

On the northern border is found the Funkturm Berlin (radio tower) and the Messe Berlin (the trade show).

Beyond the river Havel and part of the Großer Wannsee lake, the forest is rich in lakes and ponds. The biggest are the Schlachtensee, Krumme Lanke, the Grunewaldsee and the Hundekehlesee. These lakes are located on the western borders of the forest and are linked by a canal. The other lakes are the Riemeisterfenn (between Krumme Lanke and Grunewaldsee), the Teufelsee (in central-north area), and Pechsee and Barssee (both in the middle of the forest).

Environment
The Grunewald forest is mainly composed of conifers and betulaceae. Some areas are nature reserves (Naturschutzgebiet), forbidden from visitors to protect the animals (especially amphibians and birds).

Transport
The area is served by the S-Bahn line S7 at Berlin Grunewald railway station, located at the main entrance of the forest. It is also traversed by the AVUS road, now part of the BAB 115 motorway.

The border of the Grunewald can also be reached by several other S-Bahn stations : Berlin Nikolassee (S1 + S7), Berlin Schlachtensee (S1), Berlin Heerstraße (S3 + S75), Berlin Pichelsberg (S3 + S75). The southeastern borders are linked by two U-Bahn stations: Krumme Lanke and Onkel Toms Hütte (both on U3 line).

Photogallery

See also

Grunewald (locality)
Grunewald Railway Station
Grunewaldturm
Teufelsberg

References

Further reading

External links

 Official site of the Forest of Grunewald

Parks in Berlin
Tourist attractions in Berlin
Charlottenburg-Wilmersdorf
Steglitz-Zehlendorf
Forests and woodlands of Germany